South Georgia Tormenta FC 2, officially known as Tormenta FC 2, is an American soccer team based in Statesboro, Georgia, United States. Founded in 2019, the club fields a pre-professional team in USL League Two, the fourth tier of the American Soccer Pyramid. They are the reserve club of USL League One team South Georgia Tormenta FC. Tormenta FC 2 is known by the nickname Twomenta, a play off of Tormenta and the number 2.

History
The club was founded in 2019, when South Georgia Tormenta FC, which previously competed in the Premier Development League from 2016 through 2018, moved up to the professional divisions, joining the newly formed third-tier USL League One. Tormenta FC 2 was created to fill the vacated spot.

In 2019, they defended the Deep South Division title, which was won by the first team in 2018. They won the South Division playoffs, defeating Southeast Division champions The Villages SC and then Midsouth Division champions Brazos Valley Cavalry F.C. in the Conference playoffs, before falling to Eastern Conference champions Reading United AC in the National Semi-finals. Earlier in the season, they competed in the 2019 U.S. Open Cup where they defeated professional club Chattanooga Red Wolves of USL League One in the first round, before being defeated by USL Championship side Nashville SC in the next round.

Year-by-year

Honors
USL League Two
Deep South Division Champion: 2018, 2019
Southern Conference Champion: 2019

Notes

References

Tormenta FC
Association football clubs established in 2019
USL League Two teams
2019 establishments in Georgia (U.S. state)
Soccer clubs in Georgia (U.S. state)